Grier Jones (born May 6, 1946) is a former college head golf coach and former PGA Tour professional golfer.

Jones was born, raised and has been a lifelong resident of Wichita, Kansas. He attended Wichita's Kapaun Mt. Carmel Catholic High School where he played both football and golf. He won the 1963 and 1964 Kansas State High School golf championships. An All-American at Oklahoma State University, Jones won the Big Eight Championship in 1967 and 1968 before taking the individual medalist honors at the 1968 NCAA Championships. He also won the 1966 Kansas State Amateur Championship held in Topeka, Kansas while a student at Oklahoma State.

Jones spent 14 years on the PGA Tour, beginning in 1969, when he earned PGA Rookie of the Year honors. His career year was 1972 when he won two PGA Tour events and finished fourth on the final money list. He won his third and final PGA Tour event in 1977. Jones ended his career with 54 top-10 finishes in PGA Tour events. His best finish in a major championship was a T-16 at the 1978 PGA Championship.

After his full-time tour playing days ended, Jones took a club teaching job at Willowbend Golf Club in Wichita, while continuing to play part-time on the Nationwide (then called the NIKE Tour) and PGA Tours. Later he became the head pro at Terradyne Country Club in Wichita. In 1995, he was named men's head golf coach at Wichita State University, where he remained until his retirement in 2019. He was named Missouri Valley Conference Coach of the Year in 1998, 2000, 2003, and 2006.

Amateur wins
1966 Kansas State Amateur
1967 Big Eight Championship
1968 Big Eight Championship, NCAA Championship

Professional wins (4)

PGA Tour wins (3)

PGA Tour playoff record (2–0)

Other wins (1)
1968 Oklahoma Open

Results in major championships

Note: Jones never played in The Open Championship.

CUT = missed the half-way cut
"T" indicates a tie for a place

See also
Fall 1968 PGA Tour Qualifying School graduates
1983 PGA Tour Qualifying School graduates

References

External links

Terradyne Country Club official site

American male golfers
Oklahoma State Cowboys golfers
PGA Tour golfers
College golf coaches in the United States
Golfers from Wichita, Kansas
Wichita State University people
1946 births
Living people